Oriental dragon may refer to:

Chinese dragon, a legendary creature in Chinese mythology and folklore
MV Oriental Dragon, a cruise ship originally ordered by Royal Caribbean Cruise Lines
Oriental Dragon FC, a football club in Portugal, funded by Chinese investors